is a Japanese former ice hockey right winger. He competed in the men's tournament at the 1998 Winter Olympics.

References

1972 births
Living people
Japanese ice hockey right wingers
Oji Eagles players
Olympic ice hockey players of Japan
Ice hockey players at the 1998 Winter Olympics
Sportspeople from Hokkaido
Asian Games silver medalists for Japan
Medalists at the 1999 Asian Winter Games
Ice hockey players at the 1999 Asian Winter Games
Asian Games medalists in ice hockey